Islamic taxes are taxes sanctioned by Islamic law.  
They are based on both "the legal status of taxable land" and on "the communal or religious status of the taxpayer".

Islamic taxes include 
zakat - one of the five pillars of Islam. Only imposed on Muslims, it is generally described as a 2.5% tax on savings to be donated to the Muslim poor and needy. It was a tax collected by the Islamic state.
jizya - a per capita yearly tax historically levied by Islamic states on certain non-Muslim subjects—dhimmis—permanently residing in Muslim lands under Islamic law, the tax excluded the poor, women, children and the elderly. (see below)
kharaj - a land tax initially imposed only on non-Muslims but soon after mandated for Muslims as well. 
ushr - a 10% tax on the harvests of irrigated land and 10% tax on harvest from rain-watered land and 5% on Land dependent on well water. The term has also been used for a 10% tax on merchandise imported from states that taxed the Muslims on their products. Caliph `Umar ibn Al-Khattāb was the first Muslim ruler to levy ushr.

The taxes stipulated by Islamic law generally did not generate enough revenue even for the limited expenditures made by pre-modern governments, and rulers were forced to impose additional taxes, which were condemned by the ulema.

According to scholar Murat Çizakça, only zakat, jizya and kharaj are mentioned in the Buktasira.



Ushr
Ushur or ushr, in Islam, is 10 percent for irrigated lands or 10 percent for non-irrigated lands levy on agriculture produce. Caliph Umar expanded the scope of ushr to include border trade tax. It literally means a tenth part, and it remained in practice in Islamic ruled territories from Spain and North Africa through India and Southeast Asia through the 18th century. Ushur was applied only on non-Muslim traders, at a rate of 10% of the value of the merchandise that was either imported or exported across the border controlled by the Islamic state. It applied to non-Muslim traders who were residents of the Islamic state (dhimmi), as well as to non-Muslim traders who were foreigners and wished to sell their merchandise inside the Islamic state. Historical medieval era trade documents between Oman and India, refer to this tax on ships arriving at trade port as ashur or ushur. Ushr and Jizya would grant non-Muslims a privilege in war time, i.e. non-Muslims could not be obliged to join in military activities, in case, there was a war. By paying taxes, non-Muslims were protected by the Islamic law from any harm (dhimmi- the protected one), as opposed to, Muslims had to pay Zakah as well as were obliged to join in military activities in order to protect Muslims and non-Muslims alike.

References

Taxation in Islam